DWHL (756 AM) Apo Radyo is a radio station owned and operated by Beta Broadcasting System. The station's studio is located at #8 Kessing St., Brgy. Asinan, Olongapo, and its transmitter is located at Brgy. Kalaklan, Olongapo.

References

Radio stations in Olongapo
News and talk radio stations in the Philippines
Radio stations established in 1968